Robert Ross (born 11 March 1901) was a Scottish professional footballer who played as a centre half. He made appearances in the English Football League with Plymouth Argyle, Coventry City, Carlisle United and Wrexham.

References

1901 births
Date of death unknown
Scottish footballers
Association football defenders
English Football League players
Falkirk F.C. players
Stenhousemuir F.C. players
Plymouth Argyle F.C. players
Coventry City F.C. players
Workington A.F.C. players
Carlisle United F.C. players
Wrexham A.F.C. players
Scunthorpe United F.C. players
Boston Town F.C. (1920s) players
Hyde United F.C. players